The Ivan W. Day House near Stanley, Idaho is a c.1936-built Rustic style log cabin also known as Doc Day Cabin.  It was listed on the National Register of Historic Places in 1986.

It was deemed "architecturally significant as a well-preserved and nearly unaltered example of Depression era log housing in the Stanley Basin-Sawtooth Valley region. The building represents the influence of the Rustic Style, which used log construction in a self-conscious attempt to create a countrified atmosphere, upon vernacular construction."

References

Houses on the National Register of Historic Places in Idaho
Houses completed in 1936
Custer County, Idaho